Marian is a given name, either derived from Maria (female) or Marius (male). In Slovak, and sometimes in Czech, the name is spelled Marián.

Female
 Maid Marian, legendary companion of Robin Hood
 Marian Anderson (1897–1993), African-American contralto opera singer
 Marian Bakermans-Kranenburg (born 1965), Dutch scientist
 Marian Beitialarrangoitia (born 1968), Basque politician
 Marian Bell (economist) (born 1957), British economist
 Marian Bell (field hockey) (born 1958), former Australian field hockey player
 Marie Booth (1864–1937), third daughter of William and Catherine Booth, the founders of the Salvation Army
 Marian Croak (born 1955), American scientist 
 Marian Dawkins (born 1945), British biologist
 Marian Hobson (born 1941), British scholar of French
 Marian Keyes (born 1963), Irish writer
 Marian Sutton Marshall (1846–1901) English Typist and trade unionist
 Marian Pritchard (1869–1945), British fashion writer and journalist
 Marian Pour-El (1928–2009), American mathematician
 Marian Rivera (born 1984), Spanish born-Filipino actress and model
 Marian Scott (statistician) (born 1956), Scottish statistician and academic
 Marian Shields Robinson (born 1937), mother of First Lady of the United States Michelle Obama
 Marian "Tyger" Trimiar (born 1953), American pioneering women's boxer

Male
 Marian von Bardowick (died 782), German deacon and saint
 Marian Bublewicz (1950–1993), Polish rally driver, 20x Polish Rally Championship winner
 Marián Čalfa (born 1946), ethnic Slovak former Prime Minister of Czechoslovakia
 Marian Cozma (1982–2009), Romanian handball player
 Marian Czura, Polish-German filmmaker
 Marian Foik (1933–2005), Polish sprinter
 Marián Gáborík (born 1982), Slovak professional ice hockey player
 Marian Gold (born 1954), German singer from the synth pop band Alphaville
 Marian Heitger (1927–2012), German educationalist
 Marián Hossa (born 1979), Slovak professional ice hockey player
 Marian Hristov (born 1973), Bulgarian footballer
 Marian Jaworski (1926–2020), Catholic archbishop
 Marián Kochanský (1955–2006), Slovak singer
 Marián Kočner (born 1963), Slovak entrepreneur
 Marian Kudera (1923–1944), Polish resistance fighter against the Nazis
 Marián Labuda (born 1944), Slovak actor
 Marián Lapšanský (born 1947), Slovak pianist
 Marian Moszoro, (born 1974), Polish economist
 Marian Orzechowski, (1931–2020), Polish economist and politician
 Marian Oprea (born 1982), Romanian triple jumper
 Marian Rejewski (1905–1980), Polish mathematician and cryptologist who solved the Nazi Enigma machine
 Marian Sârbu (born 1958), Romanian trade unionist and politician
 Marian Smoluchowski (1872–1917), Polish physicist
 Marian Spychalski (1906–1980), Polish military leader and politician
 Marian Tumler (1887–1987), Austrian theologian and Grand Master of the Teutonic Order
 Marian Vanghelie (born 1968), Romanian politician
 Marián Varga (1947–2017), Slovak musician
 Marian Więckowski (1933–2020), Polish cyclist

See also
 Marion (given name), another unisex given name
 Marianne (given name)

References 

Unisex given names
English feminine given names
Polish masculine given names
Romanian masculine given names